No Shame is the debut studio album by Australian recording artist Sarah De Bono, who finished fourth on the first season of The Voice (Australia). The album was released on 13 July 2012, through Universal Music Australia. It features songs De Bono performed on The Voice, original songs "No Shame" and "Beautiful", as well as newly recorded covers. To promote the album, De Bono visited the Westfield Knox in Wantirna South, Victoria, where she performed two songs from the album and signed CD copies for fans. The album debuted at number seven on the ARIA Albums Chart.

Singles
The album's title track "No Shame" was released as the lead single on 29 June 2012. It peaked at number 50 on the ARIA Singles Chart.
  
Promotion

To promote the album four promotional singles were released for download including beautiful

De bono also promoted the album by supporting kelly clarkson on the Australian leg of her stronger tour .

Track listing

Charts

Release history

References

2012 debut albums
Sarah De Bono albums
Mercury Records albums